McNair High School may refer to:

Ronald E. McNair High School (California), Stockton, California
McNair High School (Georgia), DeKalb County, Georgia
Dr. Ronald E. McNair Academic High School, Jersey City, New Jersey

See also
 Ronald McNair (1950–1986), American NASA astronaut and physicist
 Matthew McNair Secondary School, a high school in Richmond, British Columbia, Canada